A settee also known as a couch or sofa, is a stuffed cushioned comfy long chair.

Settee or variation may refer to:

People
 George Settee, a member of the 1880s Nile Expedition to relieve Gordon, from the Peguis First Nation
 James Settee (1809-1902) a Swampy Cree ordained Anglican priest
 Priscilla Settee, a Cree activist in Canada
 Headmaster Settee (19th century), the second headmaster of the Gordon's Indian Residential School

Other uses
 Knole Settee, the sofa chair which was used as a throne in Knole, Kent, England, UK
 Radio Settee (album), a 1998 companion record by You Am I released along with the album #4 Record
 Settee (sail), a quadrilateral shaped lanteen sail
 settee, that which is set by the setter

See also

 
 Couch (disambiguation)
 Sofa (disambiguation)
 Satay (disambiguation)
 Setter (disambiguation)
 Sette (disambiguation)
 Sett (disambiguation)
 Sete (disambiguation)
 Seti (disambiguation)